Libertad is a small city in the San José Department of southern Uruguay. Its main commercial street is 25 de Agosto and its central square is Plaza Treinta y Tres Orientales.

Geography
The city is located on Route 1, about 50 kilometers from Montevideo

History
It was founded in November 1872. On 8 November 1902, by Decree, it was declared a "Pueblo" (village). On 1 July 1953, its status was elevated to "Villa" (town) by the Act of Ley Nº 11.964, and on 15 October 1963, to "Ciudad" (city) by the Act of Ley Nº 13.167.

Population
In 2011 Libertad had a population of 10,166.
 
Source: Instituto Nacional de Estadística de Uruguay

Places of worship
 Parish Church of Our Lady of Sorrows and St. Isidore the Laborer (Roman Catholic, Missionary Oblates of Mary Immaculate)

References

External links
INE map of Libertad

Populated places in the San José Department